Hélène Châtelain (28 December 1935 – 11 April 2020) was a French actress who appeared as "the woman" in Chris Marker's La Jetée (1962), and later worked with playwright Armand Gatti and Iossif Pasternak. She was also a translator, writer and filmmaker (Goulag).

On 11 April 2020 Châtelain died from COVID-19 at the age 84.

Selected filmography

Actress 
 La Jetée (1962)

Scriptwriter / director 
 1973: Les Prisons aussi, film 16 mn, directed by Hélène Châtelain and René Lefort. Production : G.I.P. (Michel Foucault), 1973
 1972/73: "Dix jours sur la Z.U.P. des Minguettes ou l'Amazonie est de l'autre côté de la rue", film vidéo 1/2 pouce, directed by Hélène Châtelain and Stéphane Gatti. Production : A.C.I.D.E.
 1976: Le lion, sa cage et ses ailes, 6 films vidéo 1/2 pouce by Armand Gatti, shooting and editing by Hélène Châtelain and Stéphane Gatti Production : Les Voyelles et l'I.N.A.
 1977: Siniavsky, une voix dans le cœur, film 16 mn, auteur Hélène Châtelain, réalisé par Carlos de LLanos. Production : Seuil Audiovisuel, 1977.
 1979: La première lettre, 6 films vidéo Umatic d'Armand Gatti, tournage et montage d'Hélène Châtelain, Stéphane Gatti et Claude Mouriéras. Production : Les Voyelles et l'I.N.A. (1979). Passage à FR3 en juillet/août * 1979. Et un inédit directed by H. Châtelain.
 1980: Un Poème, cinq films, video film Umatic, written by Hélène Châtelain, directed and edited by Stéphane Gatti. On the work of Armand Gatti. Production : Les Voyelles et Ministère des Relations Extérieures.
 1982: Irlande, terre promise, film vidéo Umatic, written and directed by Hélène Châtelain. Documentary on the context of the filming of Nous étions tous des noms d'arbres (We were all names of trees). Production : Les Voyelles et Dérives Films Production
 1985: Nous ne sommes pas des personnages historiques, film vidéo BVU by Hélène Châtelain. Production : Les Voyelles et l'Archéoptéryx, Documentary on the play by Armand Gatti and the character of Nestor Makhno.
 1985: Les Gens de la moitié du chemin, film vidéo BVU by Hélène Châtelain. On the Hmong community (Laos) refugees in Toulouse. Production : Les Voyelles et l'Archéoptéryx.
 1985: Le Double Voyage, film vidéo BVU by Hélène Châtelain and Christophe Loyer. Text, drawings and sculptures: Christophe Loyer ; Editing : Hélène Châtelain. Production : L'Archéoptéryx, Ministère de la culture. Les Voyelles,
 1987: Maintenant, ça va, film vidéo BVU byHélène Châtelain. Co-production : Centre Simone de Beauvoir et La Parole Errante.
 1988: Pourquoi les oiseaux chantent, film vidéo BVU  by Hélène Châtelain. Co-production : Centre Simone de Beauvoir et La Parole Errante.
 1988: Le Bannissement (film about the poet Alexandre Galitch)
 1990: Qui suis-je ? (Marseille 1990), film vidéo bétacam by Hélène Châtelain after a script by Armand Gatti Co-production La Parole Errante Vidéo 13, 1990. Portraits of trainees on Armand Gatti's play Le Cinécadre de l'esplanade Loreto reconstructed in Marseille for the great parade of the Eastern countries.
 1990: De la petite Russie à l’Ukraine, film by Iossif Pasternak, text by Leonid Plyushch (Hélène Châtelain is at the initiative of the project). Production Vidéo 13.- ARTE
 1991: Moscou, 3 jours en août, film by Iossif Pasternak, co-montage et traduction d’Hélène Châtelain. Production Vidéo 13. ARTE.
 1992: Le Fantôme Efremov
 1994: La Cité des savants (telefilm Arte)
 1995: Nestor Makhno, paysan d’Ukraine, with English subtitles on Internet Archive.
 1997: Mikhaïl A. Boulgakov, in cooperation with Iossif Pasternak
 2000: Goulag, documentary written by Hélène Châtelain, directed by Iossif Pasternak, 220 min, 13 Production8, the documentary was broadcast in June 2000 by Arte, in 2 parts (2 times 110 min)
 2003: Le Génie du mal, documentary on the Russian composer, Alexandre Lokchine (1920–1987), making Iossif Pasternak, co-written by Hélène Châtelain, 85 min, 13 Production10
 2003: Chant public devant deux chaises électriques
 2004: Efremov, lettre d’une Russie oubliée

Theatre

Comedian 
 1962: L'avenir est dans les œufs ou il faut de tout pour faire un monde by Eugène Ionesco, direction Jean-Marie Serreau, Théâtre de la Gaîté-Montparnasse
 1963: L'avenir est dans les œufs ou il faut de tout pour faire un monde by Eugène Ionesco, direction Jean-Marie Serreau, Théâtre de l'Ambigu
 1963: Amédée ou Comment s'en débarrasser by Eugène Ionesco, direction Jean-Marie Serreau, Théâtre de l'Ambigu
  1964: Maître Puntila et son valet Matti by Bertolt Brecht, direction Georges Wilson, TNP Théâtre de Chaillot
 1965: Les Troyennes by Euripides, direction by Michael Cacoyannis, TNP Théâtre de Chaillot, Festival d'Avignon 1965 and 1966
 1966: Chant public devant deux chaises électriques by Armand Gatti, directed by the author, TNP Théâtre de Chaillot
 1966: Un homme seul by Armand Gatti directed by the author, Comédie de Saint-Étienne
 1967: La Nuit des Rois by Shakespeare par les comédiens de Toulouse face aux événements du Sud-Est asiatique : V comme Vietnam by Armand Gatti, directed by Armand Gatti, Théâtre Daniel Sorano Toulouse
 1968: La Cigogne by Armand Gatti, directed by Jean Hurstel, University of Strasbourg
 1975: Le Joint by Armand Gatti, directed by Armand Gatti, Festival d'Automne, CES Jean Lurçat de Ris-Orangis
 1977: Le Cheval qui se suicide par le feu by Armand Gatti, directed by Armand Gatti, Festival d'Avignon
 1982: Le Labyrinthe by Armand Gatti, directed by Armand Gatti, Festival d'Avignon

Director 
1969: La Journée d'une infirmière, by Armand Gatti
1996: L'Enfant rat, by Armand Gatti, Festival des francophonies

Translator 
 1978: Quatre femmes terroristes contre le tsar, by Vera Zassoulitch, Olga Loubatovitch, Élisabeth Kovalskaïa, Vera Figner, texts collected and presented by Christine Fauré
 2008: Éloge des voyages insensés, by Vassili Golovanov (Prix Russophonie 2009 for translation)
 2013: Espaces et Labyrinthes, translation from Russian by Hélène Châtelain, éditions Verdier, collection « Slovo », 2013, 256 p.

Publications 
 Foreword to Armand Gatti, Les Personnages de théâtre meurent dans la rue, Revue Axolotl – Revue Nomade, n°1, 1996.
 Foreword to Armand Gatti, Opéra avec titre long, Toulouse, L’Ether vague, 1986.
 « Nestor Makhno. Les images et les mots », in Cinéma Engagé, Cinéma Enragé, L'homme Et La Société (revue internationale de recherche et de synthèse en sciences sociales) no 127–128, L'Harmattan, 1998 (DOI:10.3406/homso.1998.3562)
 L’insurrection de l’esprit : Khlebnikov / Gatti », Europe, no 877, May 2002.

References

External links 
 
 Hélène Chatelain on Les Archives du spectacle
 Hélène Châtelain on Persée
 Slovo Series directed by Hélène Châtelain: Slovo
 Site de la Parole errante : 

1935 births
2020 deaths
Actresses from Brussels
French film actresses
Deaths from the COVID-19 pandemic in France